Bocconia is a genus of flowering plants in the poppy family, Papaveraceae, that contains about 10 species. Carl Linnaeus chose the name to honor the Italian botanist Paolo Boccone (1633–1704).

Selected species
Bocconia arborea Watson
Bocconia frutescens L. – Tree poppy
Bocconia gracilis Hutch.
Bocconia integrifolia
Bocconia latisepala

Formerly placed here
Macleaya cordata (Willd.) R.Br. (as B. cordata Willd.)
Macleaya microcarpa (Maxim.) Fedde (as B. microcarpa Maxim.)

References

External links

Papaveroideae
Papaveraceae genera